Andromachi is a district of the Katerini municipality in northern Greece. Before 1986 it was part of the community of Svoronos. The 2011 census recorded 1,061 inhabitants in the settlement, which is a part of the community of Katerini.

Andromachi is the only district of Katerini on the right bank of the river Pelekas.

See also
 List of settlements in the Pieria regional unit

References

Populated places in Pieria (regional unit)